Anthony Schmid (born 18 January 1999) is a professional footballer who plays as a forward for Austria Lustenau. Born in France, he is a youth international for Austria.

Career
Schmid is a youth product of the academy of the French club Strasbourg. He then moved to Germany with the youth academy of Offenburger, before moving to Freiburg's youth side in 2013. He began his senior career with the Freiburg reserves in 2018. On 25 August 2020, he moved to the Austrian club Floridsdorfer. On 20 May 2021, he extended his contract with the club for one more year after 3 goals in 25 games in his debut season in the 2. Liga. He broke out his second season with Floridsdorfer with 11 goals in 28 appearances, and came in second in the 2. Liga narrowly avoiding promotion. He transferred to their newly promoted rivals Austria Lustenau on 27 May 2022 for their campaign in the 2022-23 Austrian Football Bundesliga, signing a 3-year contract.

International career
Born in France, Schmid elected to represent Austria internationally in 2016. He has played up to the Austria U21s.

Personal life
Schmid was born in Strasbourg, France to an Austrian father and a French mother from Alsace. His maternal grandfather is Algerian. He is the brother of the French professional footballer Jonathan Schmid.

References

External links
 
 OEFB Profile

1999 births
Living people
Footballers from Strasbourg
Austrian footballers
Austria youth international footballers
French footballers
Austrian people of French descent
Austrian people of Algerian descent
French people of Austrian descent
French sportspeople of Algerian descent
SC Freiburg II players
Floridsdorfer AC players
SK Austria Klagenfurt players
Austrian Football Bundesliga players
2. Liga (Austria) players
Regionalliga players
Austrian expatriate footballers
French expatriate footballers
Expatriate footballers in Germany
Austrian expatriate sportspeople in Germany
French expatriate sportspeople in Germany